The Florida Complex League Astros are a Rookie-level affiliate of the Houston Astros, competing in the Florida Complex League of Minor League Baseball. Prior to the 2021 season, the team was known as the Gulf Coast League Astros. The team plays its home games in West Palm Beach, Florida, at the FITTEAM Ballpark of the Palm Beaches. The team is composed mainly of players who are in their first year of professional baseball either as draftees or non-drafted free agents from the United States, Canada, Dominican Republic, Venezuela, and other countries.

History
The team first played in 1965 in the Florida Rookie League (FRL), and won the league championship. The FRL was the direct predecessor of the Gulf Coast League (GCL), which was formed in 1966. However, the team first played in the GCL during 1977–1998, capturing titles in 1979 and 1994. In 1980 and 1981, the team fielded two squads in the GCL, differentiated by Orange and Blue suffixes. The team suspended operations after the 1998 season.

The team returned to the GCL in 2009, playing their home games at Osceola County Stadium in Kissimmee, Florida. The team has operated continuously since then, and moved to West Palm Beach entering the 2017 season.

Prior to the 2021 season, the Gulf Coast League was renamed as the Florida Complex League (FCL).

Rosters

Season-by-season

References

External links
 Official website

Baseball teams established in 1965
Florida Complex League teams
Professional baseball teams in Florida
Gulf
Sports in Kissimmee, Florida
Sports in West Palm Beach, Florida
1965 establishments in Florida